Safwat al-Din Khatun (1256–1295 ,), otherwise known as Padishah Khatun(), was the ruler of Kirman from 1292 until 1295 as a member of the Qutlugh-Khanid dynasty in Persia and a poet in Persian language.

Life
She was born in 1256, as the youngest daughter of Qutb al-Din (d. 1257) and Kutlugh Turkan of Kirman. She already had her own fiefdom in Sirjan thanks to her mother Kutlugh Turkan's visit to coronation ceremony of Abaqa in 1265.  

Her first spouse was Abaqa Khan to whom she was married on 22 May 1272. The marriage was arranged by her mother to secure Mongolian support for her rule. She was granted Abaqa's late mother's Yesunjin's household. She was instrumental in strengthening rule of her mother Kutlugh Turkan and was her supporter against her siblings Muzaffar al-Din Hajjaj (1276) and Suyurghatmish (1280).

After Abaqa's death 
She did not leave for Kerman after Abaqa's death in 1282, and instead, she choose to stay in court and live with her mother until her death in 1283. She sent her sister Bibi Khatun to protect her interests in Kerman during her stay in court, ceding Sirjan to her. She obtained to co-rule Kerman due to her influence on Arghun in 1284. However, powerful vizier Buqa ruled in favor of Suyurghatmish, hastily married her to Gaykhatu and thus obtained her removal to Anatolia in 1286. She regained Sirjan in 1289 from Arghun.

Reign 
Upon Gaykhatu's election in 1291, Padishah again found herself in position of power. She demanded to be given the rule of Kirman as her personal fief, which her spouse agreed. She imprisoned her half-brother Suyurghatmish in October 1292. However he managed to escape thanks to his wife Kurdujin Khatun, only to be imprisoned again. He was finally strangled to death on 21 August 1294. She was soon granted the rule of Yazd and Shabankara. She even meddled in Ormus politics, replacing Rukn al-Din Masud with Sayf al-Din Ayaz as the prince.

Death 
When her husband Gaykhatu was assassinated on 21 March 1295, Padishah was thrown into a difficult position. She was immediately imprisoned on orders of Kurdujin Khatun and Shah Alam - Suyurghatmish's widow and daughter. She was strangled to death on her way to Baydu's court in Kushk-e Zar in June/July 1295. She was buried in Gubba-i Sabz Mausoleum as her mother during reign of Muzaffar al-Din Mohammad.

Legacy 
Padishah earned mention in the travel diary of Venetian traveler, Marco Polo, a contemporary of Padishah.He described her as “an ambitious and clever woman, who put her own brother Siyurgutmish to death as a rival.” She had both silver and gold coins struck in her name. She left handful amount of Persian poetry under the pseudonym Lala Khatun and Hasanshah. She described herself as "the child of a mighty Sultan and the fruit of the garden that is the heart of the Turks" in of her poems. She was also skilled at calligraphy.

References

Further reading
 

Women of the Mongol Empire
1256 births
1295 deaths
People of the Ilkhanate
13th-century women writers
13th-century writers
13th-century women rulers
Qutlugh-Khanids